The elegant blind snake (Afrotyphlops elegans), also called the elegant worm snake, is a species of snake in the Typhlopidae family.  It was described by Wilhelm Peters in 1868. The species occurs on the island of Príncipe in São Tomé and Príncipe.

References

Further reading
 Peters, 1868 : Über eine neue Nagergattung, Chiropodomys penicullatus, sowie über einige neue oder weniger bekannte Amphibien und Fische. Monatsberichte der Königlichen Preussischen Akademie der Wissenschaften zu Berlin

elegans
Reptiles described in 1868
Endemic vertebrates of São Tomé and Príncipe
Fauna of Príncipe
Taxa named by Wilhelm Peters